Asgarabad (also Romanized as ‘Asgarābād; also known as ‘Askarābād, Sa‘dābād Davān, and Sa‘dābād-e Davān) is a village in Deris Rural District, in the Central District of Kazerun County, Fars Province, Iran. At the 2006 census, its population was 685, in 126 families.

References 

Populated places in Kazerun County